The Tucuman Rugby Union or URT is the organisational body that controls the game of rugby union in the province of Tucumán, Argentina.

History 
Rugby was first played in Tucumán in 1915, when British enthusiasts that worked at the local sugarmills meet to play the game in the city of San Miguel de Tucumán. Nevertheless, the first official rugby team in the province –from the Club Natación y Gimnasia– would not be formed in 1936. Six years later Tucumán Rugby Club was founded, followed by Universitario Rugby Club de Tucumán in 1943 and * Cardenales in 1944. Those four clubs would go on to found the "Unión de Rugby del Norte" on 29 February 1944.

Although the URN was based in Tucumán Province it also dealt with fledgling clubs from the neighbouring provinces of Salta, Jujuy and Santiago del Estero. Later these provinces would go on to form their own unions: Unión de Rugby de Salta in 1951, Unión Jujeña de Rugby in 1966 and Unión Santiagueña de Rugby in 1968. After that the Unión de Rugby del Norte became simply known as the Unión de Rugby de Tucumán and only dealt with clubs from Tucumán Province.

Provincial side 

The URT was represented by its own team in Campeonato Argentino, a now defunct competition in which each of the 24 unions that make up the Argentine Rugby Union (UAR) participated.

Titles 
 Campeonato Argentino (11): 1985, 1987, 1988, 1989, 1990, 1992, 1993, 2005, 2010, 2013, 2014

Club competitions 
Eleven member clubs are affiliated with the Union and take part in the union's provincial competitions. They also compete in the annual Torneo del Norte, a regional competition that also includes teams from the neighboring unions of Salta, Santiago del Estero and Jujuy.

Clubs from Tucumán have enjoyed some success in the national club tournament with Tucumán Rugby Club reaching the final twice in 1993 and 2007, and Los Tarcos Rugby Club once in 2004.

Torneo del Noroeste

Tucumán clubs take part in the Torneo del Noroeste (or simply Torneo del NOA), along with teams from Salta, Jujuy and Santiago del Estero.

The Noroeste tournament has traditionally been dominated by clubs from Tucumán, clubs from the other 3 provinces have yet to win a title. The most successful teams are Universitario and Tucumán Rugby Club with 21 and 20 titles respectively.

Every year, the best ranked teams from the Noroeste go on to play in the annual Torneo del Interior, where they meet teams from the country's other regional tournaments: Litoral, Centro, Noreste, Pampeana, Oeste and Patagónico.

The two finalists of the Interior then go on to meet the two finalists of the Buenos Aires League in the Nacional de Clubes competition.

So far, two clubs from Tucumán have reached the final of the Nacional: Tucumán RC in 1993 and 2007 and Los Tarcos in 2004. However, both clubs lost and a Tucumán club has yet to win the national title.

Local competitions
Like all other provincial unions, the URT organises local competitions for underage and reserve teams.

Member clubs

 Aguara Guazú
 Bajo Fondo 
 Cardenales
 Coipu (Famaillá)
 Corsarios 
 Huirapuca 
 Jockey Club 
 Lince
 La Querencia
 San Isidro RC (Lules)
 Tafí Viejo
 Los Tarcos
 Natación y Gimnasia
 Tucumán Lawn Tennis
 Tucumán RC
 Universitario de Tucumán

See also 
Torneo del Noroeste

References

External links
 

Tuc
Sport in Tucumán Province

Sports organizations established in 1944
1944 establishments in Argentina